Miomantis abyssinica is a species of praying mantis in the family Miomantidae, native to North Africa.

It is one of several species sometimes known as the Egyptian praying mantis, along with Miomantis paykullii and Miomantis pharaonica.

Description
It lives in hot and dry conditions, including the Sahara desert.

It can range from yellow to light green in color.

Adult mantises are usually 30–40 mm in length, though male mantises can be 5 mm longer, and females are slightly bigger and heavier than the males.

See also
List of mantis genera and species

References

A
Mantodea of Africa
Insects of Egypt
Insects of North Africa
Insects of Sudan
Fauna of the Sahara